The Swedish diaspora consists of emigrants and their descendants, especially those that maintain some of the customs of their Swedish culture. Notable Swedish communities exist in the United States, Argentina, Australia, Canada, New Zealand, Brazil, and the United Kingdom as well as others.

History
The New Sweden Company established a colony on the Delaware River in 1638, naming it New Sweden. The colony was lost to the Dutch in 1655.

Between 1846 and 1930, roughly 1.3 million people, about 20% of the Swedish population, left the country.

In the United States members of the diaspora had access to Swedish films starting in 1922 with The Treasure of Arne which was shown in Minneapolis, Minnesota. Some films were made just for the Swedish American diaspora community such as The Film About Sweden and The Old Land of Dreams.

The first recognition by Sweden of the 19th century emigration to the United States occurred in 1923 with a visit by Nathan Söderblom and the 1926 visit by the crown prince, who would later rule as Gustaf VI Adolf of Sweden. He would visit again in 1938.

Swedish expatriates in Manhattan celebrate Midsummer as "a particularly grand example of the Swedish diaspora's ability to hold on to its culture while fully integrating on a global scale."

Distribution

Finland

The Swedish-speaking Finns or Finland-Swedes form a minority group in Finland. The characteristic of this minority is debated: while some see it as an ethnic group of its own some view it purely as a linguistic minority. The group includes about 265,000 people, comprising 5.10% of the population of mainland Finland, or 5.50% if the 26,000 inhabitants of Åland are included (there are also about 60,000 Swedish-speaking Finns currently resident in Sweden). It has been presented that the ethnic group can also be perceived as a distinct Swedish-speaking nationality in Finland. There are also 9,000 Swedish citizens living in Finland.

Germany

Approximately 23 000 Swedes live in Germany.

Estonia

The presence of Swedish-speaking permanent residents in what is now Estonia (Estonian Swedes) was first documented in the 14th century, and possibly dates back to the Viking Age. There were an estimated 12,000 Swedes resident in Estonia in 1563, mainly distributed along the coastal regions and islands. Estonia was under Swedish rule 1558–1710, after which the territory was ceded to Russia in the 1721 Treaty of Nystad. In 1781, 1,300 Estonian Swedes of the island of Hiiumaa (Dagö) were forced to move to New Russia (today Ukraine) by Catherine II of Russia, where they formed Gammalsvenskby (Old Swedish Village). According to the 1934 census, there were 7,641 Estonian Swedes (Swedish speaking, 0.7% of the population in Estonia), making Swedes the third largest national minority in Estonia, after Russians and Germans. During World War II, almost the entire community of Estonian Swedes fled to Sweden. Today there are, at most, a few hundred Estonian Swedes living in Estonia and a few hundred in Russia and Ukraine, with the estimates varying widely depending on who identifies, or can be identified, as a Swede. Many of them are living in northwestern mainland Estonia and on adjacent islands and on the island of Ruhnu (Runö) in the Gulf of Riga.

In a nationalist context, the ethnic Swedes living outside Sweden are sometimes called 'East-Swedes' (in Swedish: östsvenskar), to distinguish them from the ethnic Swedes living in Sweden proper, called rikssvenskar.

France
Many Swedes spend their holidays in France especially in the South of France, small towns and villages. altogether totaling 20,000 to 25,000. They live in Ile-de-France, Nord-Pas-de-Calais, Languedoc-Rousillon, Midi-Pyrenees, Brittany, Poitou-Charentes, Picardy, Upper Normandy, Lorraine, Alsace, Provence-Alpes-Cote d'Azur, Aquitaine, Pays de la Loire, Centre-Val de Loire and in the Gallic country.

North America

There are numerous Swedish descendants in places like the United States and Canada (i.e. Swedish Americans and Swedish Canadians), including some who still speak Swedish.

The majority of the early Swedish immigrants to Canada came via the United States. It wasn't until after 1880 that significant numbers of Swedes immigrated to Canada. From WWI onwards, almost all of the Swedish immigrants entered Canada coming directly from Sweden. In addition to Swedish immigrants from south-central part of Sweden, a relatively large number of Swedish immigrants came from Stockholm and northern Sweden. The newcomers played an important role in the development of the Canadian prairies.

Swedish Canadians can be found in all parts of the country, but the largest population resides in British Columbia. Many Swedish social, cultural, political, business and welfare organizations, both religious and secular, can be found in all major Canadian cities and some of the smaller towns and rural communities. Some of the Swedish traditions, such as Midsummer, Walpurgis, and St Lucia are still celebrated by the community today.

South America

Swedes settled mainly in Argentina. Numerous communities can be found in South America, especially in the Misiones Province and Buenos Aires, in Argentina, in the South and Southeast of Brazil, and there are some Swedish communities in Uruguay.

Oceania

Many Swedes settled in Australia and New Zealand. Organized immigration from Sweden occurred during the 19th century when Queensland and Tasmania invited immigrants to take up farming leases. Many people of Swedish descent can be found in these countries.

United Kingdom

Scandinavian migration to Britain is a phenomenon that has occurred at different periods over the past 1,200 years.

See also

 Swedish emigration to the United States
 Finnish diaspora
 Danish diaspora
 Norwegian diaspora
 Icelandic diaspora

References

 
European diasporas